Island Bayou is a  tributary of the Red River in Oklahoma.

The stream rises northwest of Calera in Bryan County and flows southeastward before emptying into the Red River south of Wade. Its entire length is within Bryan County.

The Treaty of Doaksville (1837) set Island Bayou as the boundary between the Chickasaw and Choctaw Nations in Indian Territory; however, the description was uncertain. It was not until 1854 that the Choctaw-Chickasaw treaty of that year gave certainty to the boundary:
"viz: Beginning on the north bank of the Red River, at the mouth of Island Bayou, where it empties into the Red River...thence, northerly along the eastern prong of Island Bayou to its source; thence, due north to the Canadian River".

The Texas Road and the old Butterfield Overland Mail route ran past the head of Island Bayou at Fisher's Station, also known as Carriage Point.

Sources

Kappler, Charles (ed.). "TREATY WITH THE CHOCTAW AND CHICKASAW, 1837 (Doaksville)". Indian Affairs: Laws and Treaties. Washington: Government Printing Office, 1904. 2:486-488 (accessed August 25, 2006).
Kappler, Charles (ed.). "TREATY WITH THE CHOCTAW AND CHICKASAW, 1854" . Indian Affairs: Laws and Treaties. Washington: Government Printing Office, 1904. 2:652-653 (accessed August 25, 2006).
Wright, Muriel H. "Organization of the Counties in the Choctaw and Chickasaw Nations". Chronicles of Oklahoma 8:3 (September 1930)  315-334. (accessed August 26, 2006).

External links
Longitudinal Distribution of Fishes from a Fall Sample of Island Bayou, a South-Central Oklahoma Stream
Island Bayou Creek Bridge
United States Geological Survey. Source Island Bayou-Map from TopoQuest. (accessed June 29, 2008).
United States Geological Survey. Mouth of Island Bayou-Map from TopoQuest. (accessed June 29, 2008).
 Oklahoma Digital Maps: Digital Collections of Oklahoma and Indian Territory

Rivers of Oklahoma
Rivers of Bryan County, Oklahoma
Tributaries of the Red River of the South